
Year 831 (DCCCXXXI) was a common year starting on Sunday (link will display the full calendar) of the Julian calendar.

Events 
 By place 
 Byzantine Empire 
 Byzantine–Arab War: Emperor Theophilos invades the Abbasid dominions, and reaches the Euphrates River in north-eastern Syria. He captures and sacks the city of Tarsus, but is defeated in Cappadocia.
 Summer – Muslim Arabs under Caliph Al-Ma'mun launch an invasion into Anatolia (modern Turkey), and capture a number of Byzantine forts. Heraclea Cybistra and Tyana fall to the Arabs.   
 Fall – Muslim Arabs reinvade Sicily, and lay siege to Palermo. Symeon, Byzantine commander of the imperial bodyguard (spatharios), surrenders the city in exchange for a safe departure.

 Europe 
 Emperor Louis the Pious is reinstated as sole ruler of the Frankish Empire. He promises his sons Pepin I and Louis the German a greater share of the inheritance. His eldest son Lothair I is pardoned, but disgraced and banished to Italy.
 February – Empress Judith stands trial to "undergo the judgment of the Franks" for an assembly arranged by Louis the Pious and exonerated.
 Omurtag, ruler (khan) of the Bulgarian Empire, dies after a 17-year reign. He is succeeded by his youngest son Malamir, because his older brother Enravota favours Christianity.
 Nominoe, duke of Brittany, is designated missus imperatoris (imperial emissary) by Louis the Pious, at Ingelheim (modern Germany).

 China 
 A Uyghur Turk sues the son of a Chinese general, who had failed to repay a debt of 11 million government-issued copper coins. Emperor Wenzong hears the news, and is so upset that he not only banishes the general, but attempts to ban all trade between Chinese and foreigners except for goods and livestock. This ban is unsuccessful, and trade with foreigners resumes, especially in maritime affairs overseas.

 By topic 
 Religion 
 Summer – Ansgar, Frankish missionary, founds the first church at Birka (modern Sweden).
 Ansgar is consecrated; he travels to Rome to receive the pallium from Pope Gregory IV.

Births 
 Wang Chucun, general of the Tang Dynasty (d. 895)

Deaths 
 July 10 – Zubaidah bint Ja`far, Abbasid princess
 December 26 – Euthymius of Sardis, Byzantine monk and bishop
 Omurtag, ruler (khan) of the Bulgarian Empire
 Sadyrnfyw, Welsh bishop (approximate date)
 Yuan Zhen, politician of the Tang Dynasty (b. 779)

References